The fifth election to South Glamorgan County Council was held in May 1989. It was preceded by the 1985 election and followed by the 1993 election.

Boundary changes
There were no boundary changes at this election.

Candidates
Conservative and Labour candidates contested all seats. Following the break-up of the SDP-Liberal Alliance, most seats were contested by both the Social and Liberal Democrats and the continuing SDP. There were a smaller number of Plaid Cymru and Green Party candidates and a few Independents.

Outcome
Labour retained control with an increased majority, by capturing a number of Conservative seats. A few other seats also changed hands. The Social and Liberal Democrats held all their seats bar one, but polled poorly elsewhere.

A by-election was held on the same day in the Vale of Glamorgan constituency. This resulted in a much higher turnout than usual for local elections in wards which lay within the constituency. Labour captured the parliamentary seat from the Conservatives.

This table summarises the result of the elections in all wards. 62 councillors were elected.

|}

One of the Labour 'gains' was in Thornhill ward which the party had already won at a by-election.

Ward Results

Adamsdown

Baruc

Butetown

Buttrills

Cadoc

Canton

Castleland

Central

Cornerswell

Court

Cowbridge

Cyncoed Village

Cyntwell

Deri

Dinas Powys North

Dinas Powys South

Dyfan

Eglwys Wen

Fairwater

Gabalfa

Gibbonsdown

Glan Ely

Heath Park

Highmead

Illtyd

Lakeside

Landsdowne

Lisvane with St Mellons

Llandaff

Llandaff North

Llanedeyrn

Llanrumney North

Llanrumney South

Mackintosh

Maindy

North Whitchurch with Tongwynlais

Pantllacca

Pantmawr

Park

Pentre Bane

Penylan

Plymouth

Pontcanna

Radyr with St Fagans

Rhoose with Llancarfan

Riverside South

Rumney

Saltmead

Splott

St Athan with Boverton

St Augustines

Stanwell

The Marl

Thornhill
The seat had been won by an Alliance (SDP) candidate in 1985 but was gained by Labour at a subsequent by-election.

Ton-yr-Ywen

Trelai

Tremorfa

Trowbridge

Ty Glas

Vale of Glamorgan North East

Vale of Glamorgan South West

Waterloo

KEY

* existing councillor, for the same ward

By-elections between 1989 and 1993

Two by-elections were held on 2 May 1991, the same day as elections to Cardiff City Council. Both were defended by the Liberal Democrats with one of the seats being narrowly lost to Labour.

Cyncoed Village

Pantllacca

Notes

References

1989 Welsh local elections
South Glamorgan County Council elections